Val Verde High School is a "continuation" high school for troubled teens located in Perris, California, United States. Most of its students come from the neighboring Rancho Verde High School because of lack of credits, disciplinary problems, or teenage pregnancy.  It is part of the Val Verde Unified School District. 

As of 2005, Val Verde High had less than 1500 students, few of whom are expected to attend college.  Rather, they are offered a variety of vocational courses.  The school lets students gain credits at every quarter, which is an accelerated pace.

External links
 Val Verde High School

High schools in Riverside County, California
Perris, California
Public high schools in California